Westerpark may refer to:
 Westerpark (park), a park in Amsterdam, Netherlands
 Westerpark (neighbourhood), a neighbourhood in Amsterdam, Netherlands
 Westerpark (former borough), a former borough in Amsterdam, Netherlands